Mystacoleucus is a genus of cyprinid fishes that are found in Southeast Asia.  There are currently eight described species in this genus.

Species
 Mystacoleucus argenteus (F. Day, 1888)
 Mystacoleucus atridorsalis Fowler, 1937
 Mystacoleucus chilopterus Fowler, 1935
 Mystacoleucus ectypus Kottelat, 2000
 Mystacoleucus greenwayi Pellegrin & P. W. Fang, 1940
 Mystacoleucus lepturus S. Y. Huang, 1979
 Mystacoleucus obtusirostris (Valenciennes, 1842)
 Mystacoleucus padangensis (Bleeker, 1852)

References
 

Cyprinid fish of Asia
Cyprinidae genera
Taxa named by Albert Günther